This article describes the Pan-American Highway's routing in South America from north to south. For the North America portion of the route, see Pan-American Highway (North America).

The project of the Pan-American highway began approximately in or before 1923. The main idea was to create a network of wide roads that would connect major points of interest in North and South America with a single highway.

The longest segment connects the Brazilian city of Macapá in Amapá State to Cayenne in French Guiana, Paramaribo by the East-West Link Highway in Suriname, Georgetown in Guyana, and Boa Vista city in Roraima Brazilian State. Boa Vista is connected with all the cities in Venezuela such as Ciudad Guayana, its easternmost city. The highway supports trade among these countries. The three large rivers cross the highway in places, however, an international system of ferries helps span these natural obstacles.

Venezuela
The highway begins its path through South America in Colombia. However, a branch called the Simon Bolivar Highway runs through Venezuela. This stretch of the highway is an important link between Caracas and Bogotá.

Güiria
The road begins as Venezuela Highway 9 in Güiria, a small town in the state of Sucre just west of Trinidad along the Gulf of Paria coastline. From Güiria, the highway winds west  towards the town of Yaguaraparo.

Yaguaraparo

Casanay
Upon reaching Casanay, the highway crosses Venezuela Highway 10, a major north–south highway. From Casanay and neighboring Pantoño, it continues west, paralleling the Gulf of Cariaco. The highway crosses Secondary Highway 2 at Villa Frontado, which travels south into the state of Monagas.

Cumaná
Cumaná, founded in 1521, is the oldest city in South America. Cumaná is located on the banks of the Manzanares River and the Gulf of Cariaco. Tourist attractions in Cumaná include the Castillo de San Antonio de la Eminencia (Castle of Saint Anthony of the Eminence), the Museo del Mar (Maritime Museum), and the Cueva del Guácharo (Guácharo Cave). From Cumaná, the road travels southwest approximately 65 km to the border with the state of Anzoátegui.

Barcelona
After crossing into Anzoátegui, it almost immediately enters the city of Barcelona.
Barcelona was founded in 1671 and is a traditional Venezuelan city. Local attractions include Barcelona Cathedral and Casa Fuerte, a national historic monument that celebrates Venezuelan independence. Nearby Puerto La Cruz is one of the most popular tourist areas in Venezuela and has some of the nation's best Caribbean beaches. Tourists can take a ferry from Puerto La Cruz to Margarita Island.

Boca de Uchire
Travelling from Barcelona and Puerto La Cruz, the highway continues westward. For about 47 km, it becomes a limited-access expressway, returning to a two-lane highway at Puerto Píritu. The highway travels another 62 km reaches the border with the state of Miranda at the town of Boca de Uchire. This portion includes a short run through the llanos, or Venezuelan savannas.

El Guapo
About 34 km west of Boca de Uchire, the highway starts climbing up the Cordillera Central, in the Andes mountains. Highway 9 begins here to move further away from the Caribbean Sea coastline. From Boca de Uchire to El Guapo the distance is 65 km; from El Guapo to Caucagua adds 59 km.

Caucagua
At Caucagua, the Pan-American Highway crosses Venezuela Highway 12. Highway 9 continues through the Cordillera Central. After about 21 km, the highway becomes a limited-access expressway for 32 km west towards the Caracas metropolitan area and the Venezuelan Federal District.

Caracas
With a population of around four million, Caracas is the largest city and capital of Venezuela.

Attractions include the Teresa Carreño Theater, the National Art Gallery, and Avila National Park. The Pan-American Highway switches from Highway 9 in Caracas to turn south on Venezuela Highway 1, where it re-enters Miranda. It remains an expressway as it heads towards Carabobo for its remaining 48 km in Miranda.

Maracay
Maracay is the capital and most important city of Aragua state in central Venezuela. It was officially established on March 5, 1701, by Bishop Diego de Baños y Sotomayor in the valleys of Tocopio and Tapatapa (what is known today as the central valley of Aragua) in northern Venezuela.

In Spanish, Maracay is known as "Ciudad Jardín", or "Garden City". Maracay was the name of a Cacique (Indian chief) of the indigenous people who lived in the area before the Spanish arrived. Apparently, the word means "tiger" in an ancient Caribbean language. Maracay is the cradle of Venezuelan aviation, and home to the two country's largest Air Force bases and other military facilities.

From Maracay the highway extends about 44 km to Valencia, passing San Joaquin and near Cuacara en route to the city.

Valencia
Valencia is the capital city of Carabobo state. The city is an economic hub that contains Venezuela's top industries and manufacturing companies. Its population is about 1.4 million. Valencia is known for its racial and international diversity. On its eastern outskirts lies Lake Valencia, Venezuela's second largest lake. Tourist sights include Casa Páez, Casa de los Celis, the Museum of History and Anthropology and Iturriza Palace.

In Valencia, the highway shifts northwest and passes through mountains that are part of the Sistema Coriano. The distance between Valencia and the small town of El Palito on the Caribbean Sea is approximately 40 km. At El Palito, the road joins with Venezuela Highway 3 for 10 km, then splits off at Morón. The distance from Morón to the state border with Yaracuy state and the village of Guaremal is about 20 km.

San Felipe
From Guaremal to San Felipe, the major city in Yaracuy, is about 26 km. The city itself is located on a route adjacent to Highway 1. The road runs 73 km from San Felipe to the state border with Lara (located just past the town of Cambural).

Barquisimeto
The distance from the border to Barquisimeto is about 16 km.

Barquisimeto, the capital of Lara state, is a successful industrial and commercial centre. It has one of the largest markets in Latin America - Mercabar - where about 80% of the food produced in Venezuela is distributed throughout the country, and various shopping malls like Las Trinitarias, Ciudad París and Babylon. Among its many landmarks is an obelisk (El Obelisco) which commemorates Barquisimeto's 400th anniversary; and the oddly-shaped cathedral, rare in Latin America, that sits below a cross-like tinted glass dome.

From Barquisimeto, Highway 1 continues roughly west, then southwest (at around Agua Salada) for 147 km to the state line with Trujillo, near El Empedrado.

Trujillo (state)
Once in the state of Trujillo (near the town of Parajá), the Pan-American Highway continues in a southwest direction; it does not travel through the state capital city of Trujillo but connects to Trujillo by way of state highways 3 and 1. The highway's length in this state is about 111 km.

Mérida (state)
The highway enters Mérida state near Arapuey. As in Trujillo, the highway does not travel through the major population centers, of which the largest is Mérida. Highway 1 connects to Mérida via an 88 km stretch of Mérida state highway 4. About 5 km southwest of Caja Seca is a 13 km cutoff road to Lake Maracaibo, Venezuela's largest lake and one of the largest on the continent. The highway covers 104 km in Mérida.

San Cristóbal
Upon entering the state of Táchira, the high extends about 58 km from the border to the junction with Venezuela Highway 6. From the junction to the city of San Cristóbal the distance is 44 km, although there is a separate expressway that parallels the Pan-American Highway along this stretch. From San Cristóbal to the Venezuela-Colombia border, near San Antonio de Táchira, the distance is 32 km.

Colombia
From Yaviza, Panama southeast lies the virtually impenetrable Darién Gap, a  stretch of some of the world's most rugged, mountainous jungle terrain. It is advised that travelers do not enter the Darién Gap as it is considered dangerous; it is a haven for bandits, smugglers, and Colombian paramilitary forces. The Colombian town nearest to the Darién Gap is Turbo, located in Antioquia province. The highway linking Turbo to Medellín is Colombia Route 62 and is approximately 278 km in length.

Travelers along the Inter-American Highway portion of the Pan-American Highway in Panama can take a ferry from Panama City to the port of Buenaventura, which is 115 km northwest of Cali. Cali represents a major junction between Buenaventura and two northern spurs of the Pan-American Highway that connect from northern Colombia and Venezuela.

Cúcuta
The main route of the Pan-American Highway in Colombia (starting from the northeast) begins just east of Cúcuta, the capital city of the department of Norte de Santander. The highway follows Colombia Route 55 for 63 km from Cúcuta to Pamplona, where it shifts to Colombia Route 66 for 45 km to reach the border with the department of Santander.

Bucaramanga
From the department border, Route 66 continues southwest for 50 km toward Bucaramanga, state capital of Santander located on a plateau in the Cordillera Oriental. From Bucaramanga, the Pan-American Highway switches from Route 66 to Colombia Route 45A, which it follows south by southwest to the town of Barbosa. This 203-km stretch on Route 45A is a toll road. Approximately 26 km of this stretch of highway enters the department of Boyacá and reenters Santander between Vado Real and Guepsa. From Barbosa, the Pan-American Highways switches from Route 45A to Colombia Route 62 and immediately reenters Boyacá towards Tunja, the state capital of Boyacá.

Tunja
A 53-km stretch of highway connects Barbosa with Tunja, an important agriculture and mining center in the region. The Pan-American Highway switches routes again in Tunja, returning to Colombia Route 55 on its way to Cundinamarca and the national capital, Bogotá. The stretch of highway from Tunja to the departmental border with Cundinamarca is 54 km and is a toll road.

Bogotá
From the Cundinamarca departmental line, the highway continues another 26 km without tolls before becoming a toll road again. From that point, the highway reaches Bogotá in 52 km. Bogotá is the capital and largest city of Colombia, with a population of roughly 7.8 million (about 8.5 million in the metropolitan area). Bogotá is Colombia's largest economic center and is a center of art, culture, and learning.

In Bogotá, the highway crosses from the north to the southwest portion of the city, switching from Route 55 to Colombia Route 40. Continuing as a toll road from Bogotá, it travels for 128 km through Fusagasugá to the departmental border with Tolima.

Ibagué
From the Tolima departmental border, the highway continues as a toll road for another 16 km to El Espinal. It travels west and after another 37 km, reaches the city of Ibagué. Ibagué is the capital of Tolima department and has an estimated population of 422,549.

From Ibagué to the Quindío departmental border near La Linea is about 77 km.

Armenia
Upon crossing into Quindío, Colombia Route 40 continues westward for another 4 km before reaching Calarcá, where Route 40 splits into two spurs. One enters Armenia. The spurs rejoin about 18 km southwest of Calarcá at the town of Club Campestre. The city of Armenia has about 300,000 people and an economy based on coffee and bananas. Armenia has several universities, including the University of Gran Colombia and the University of Quindío.

From Club Campestre, it covers another 16 km until reaching the Valle del Cauca departmental border.

Cali
From the border, the Pan-American Highway travels 26 km to the town of La Paila, where it crosses Colombia Route 25. At this junction, the two routes merge and become a toll road for 61 km from that point to Buga. At Buga, Route 40 splits west toward the city of Buenaventura and the Pacific Ocean; the Pan-American Highway continues south on Route 25 for another 42 km until arriving near Palmira. From Palmira, the highway continues southwest for 23 km, where it reaches the large city of Cali.

Santiago de Cali, the city's complete name, is the capital of the Valle del Cauca department. It is Colombia's second largest city, with an estimated population of 2.3 million and a metropolitan area population of 4.3 million. Popular museums include the Museo Arqueológico La Merced (La Merced Archeological Museum) and the Museo del Oro del Banco de la República (Bank of the Republic Gold Museum), containing archaeological exhibits of pre-Columbian cultures.

From Cali to the Cauca departmental border is 19 km.

Popayán
The highway continues south along Route 25 throughout its length in the department of Cauca. After 50 km, the highway becomes a toll road at Santander de Qulichao until reaching Santander de Qulichao and Popayán after 74 km.

Popayán is the capital of the department of Cauca, with a population of about 215,000. More presidents have come from Popayán than any other city and it birthed noted poets, painters and composers. Nearby is Puracé National Park, a geothermal hotspot with hot springs, waterfalls, and an inactive volcano from which the park derives its name.

It continues generally southwest from Popayán; reaching Mojarras after 135 km. At Mojarras, Route 25 splits into two spurs; the western spur is preferred for traveling south toward the Nariño departmental border. From Mojarras to the departmental border near Remolino is 36 km.

Pasto
From the Nariño departmental border, the highway continues south as Route 25. From the border to the city of Pasto is 84 km.

Pasto is the capital of the department of Nariño, located in southwest Colombia. The city has a population of 450,000. Pasto is the center of an agricultural region that specializes in dairy products. Furniture manufacturing is an important part of the local economy.

From Pasto to the national border between Colombia and Ecuador near Ipiales is 82 km. The Pan American crosses the border at the Rumichaca Bridge.

Ecuador
Ecuador Highway 35, the "Troncal de la Sierra" (Highland's Road), is commonly known to Ecuadorians as "La Panamericana" and forms Ecuador's contribution to the project. It connects cities and towns from the Sierra region, from Tulcán at the north (border with Colombia), passing through Quito, the country's capital, to the southern border with Peru. Part of this highway is a toll-road administered by Panavial, a private concessionary. The road condition is quite good, but it mostly goes through mountains and it has some bad trails around the province of Cañar (center of the country), making it a fairly dangerous road to drive on.

Tulcán
The Ecuadorian portion begins at the Colombian border in Carchi province and almost immediately enters the city of Tulcán, the capital of Carchi province. The population of Tulcán is approximately 53,000. Tulcán is known for its hot springs and a topiary garden cemetery created by José Franco.

From Tulcán, the road continues south for 125 km, reaching Ibarra.

Ibarra
Ibarra (population 80,477) is the capital of Imbabura province. It lies at the foot of Imbabura volcano and on the left bank of the Tahuando river. Ibarra is a market town popular with tourists. It features colonial white-washed houses (giving it the nickname The White City) and cobbled streets. The Santa Domingo church houses an art museum.

From Ibarra, the highway continues south for 115 km until reaching Quito.

Quito
Quito is Ecuador's capital and second largest city (after Guayaquil). It is located in the Guayllabamba river basin on the eastern slopes of the Pichincha, an active stratovolcano in the Andes. It is the world's second highest capital city, behind La Paz, Bolivia. Its 2001 population was 1,399,378 (census data). Points of interest include Museo del Banco Central (Museum of the Central Bank) and several parks, including Parque Metropolitano (Metropolitan Park), La Carolina, El Ejido, and La Alameda. Parque Metropolitano, with its  is the largest urban park in South America and is larger than New York City's Central Park.

From Quito, the highway continues south for 89 km next reaching Latacunga.

Latacunga
Latacunga sits on a plateau, as capital of Cotopaxi province, near the confluence of the Alaques and Cutuchi that form the Patate, the headstream of the Pastaza. Latacunga stands on the old road between Guayaquil and Quito.

From Latacunga, the Pan-American Highway continues south for 47 km to Ambato.

Ambato
Ambato (officially San Juan de Ambato) is in the center of Ecuador near the Ambato River. The population is 154,095. The city is a leading commercial and transportation center for a fertile region near the northern foot of the Chimborazo volcano. It hosts the country's largest animal market. Landmarks include the mausoleum of Juan Montalvo, the estate of Juan León Mera, and the white Ambato Cathedral.

From Ambato, the road continues south for 52 km to Riobamba.

Azogues
Azogues is capital of Cañar Province.

From Azogues the road becomes six lanes wide (three north, three south) built in 1995, until it reaches Cuenca.

Cuenca
Cuenca is the commercial center of the southern region, an UNESCO World Heritage Site and the third largest city in Ecuador by population (more than 467,000 by 2010). Points of interest include the Old Cathedral (Iglesia de El Sagrario), New cathedral (official name: Catedral Metropolitana de la Inmaculada Concepción), Park Abdon Calderon, Monastery of El Carmen de Asuncion, Monastery and Museum of La Concepcion, House of the Ecuadorian Culture, Municipal Museum Remigio Crespo Toral, Museum of the Central Bank, Museum of the Aboriginal Cultures, Church of Santo Domingo, San Blas and Ruinas de todos los santos (niches of Inca origin).

From north of the city the Pan-American Highway takes the name of Avenida Circunvalación Sur (Avenue South Ring) until exiting to the south, where it takes shrinks to two lanes (one north, one south) enlarged in 2009 until reaching Loja.

Peru
Peru Highway 1 runs north–south the length of the country and connects all major cities in the coastal area.

The northern terminus of the highway is located in Aguas Verdes (Tumbes Region) at the border with Ecuador. Starting in this point, the highway is known as Carretera Panamericana Norte ("North Pan-American Highway") until it reaches a point located in central Lima, the country's capital.

Tumbes
From Aguas Verdes to Tumbes 23 km

Piura
From Tumbes to Sullana 232 km

From Sullana to Piura 50 km

Lambayeque
From Piura to Chiclayo 213 km

La Libertad
From Chiclayo to Trujillo 209 km

Ancash
From Trujillo to Chimbote 130 km

Lima
From Chimbote to Lima 440 km

From this point south the highway is called Carretera Panamericana Sur ("South Pan-American Highway"), until it reaches the southern border, located in the Santa Rosa Border Post (36 km south of Tacna, the highway's closest major city), in the Tacna Region at the border with Chile.

From Lima to Cañete 148 km

Ica
From Cañete to Chincha Alta 52 km

From Chincha Alta to Pisco 50 km

From Pisco to Ica 75 km

From Ica to Nazca 135 km

Arequipa
From Nazca to Arequipa 570 km

Moquegua
From Arequipa to Moquegua 225 km

Tacna
From Moquegua to Tacna 123 km

From Tacna to Arica, Chile 82 km

Chile
 Ed. Note: Major cities are emphasized. Locations of interest that are not strictly "on" the Pan-American Highway are italicized. Cities are listed southbound, subdivided by Regiones (lit. Regions).

Chile Ruta 5
 Ruta 5 (Chile Route 5) begins at the Chilean-Peruvian border. Although the section of Ruta 5 that is part of Pan-American Highway ends in Santiago, the entirety of Ruta 5 is known to be referred to as "[La] Pan-Americana" ("[The] Pan-American") or as "[La] Norte-Sur" (literally "[The] North-South"). Ruta 5 extends as far south as Quellón, on Chiloé Island.

Región de Tarapacá
19 km to Arica

104 km to Cuya

80 km to Zapiga

46 km to Huara

25 km to Humberstone
 From Humberstone: 46 km westbound on Ruta 16 to Iquique

5 km to Pozo Almonte

8 km to Sara

35 km to Pintados

45 km to Lagunas

60 km to Hilaricos

18 km to Quillagua, Región de Antofagasta

Región de Antofagasta
45 km to El Toco

53 km to Miraje

15 km to Pedro de Valdivia

62 km to Carmen Alto

26 km to Baquedano

31 km to Prat

13 km to Uribe

23 km to Antofagasta

22 km to La Negra

29 km to Varillas

91 km to Los Vientos

88 km to Agua Verde

155 km to Chañaral, Región de Atacama

Región de Atacama
28 km to Flamenco

64 km to Caldera

89 km to Copiapó

22 km to Travesía

64 km to Carrizal Alto Algarrobal

42 km to Chacaritas

17 km to Vallenar

16 km to Agua Amarga

33 km to Domeyko

18 km to Cachiyuyo

40kmkm to Incaguasi

35 km to La Higuera

55 km to La Serena
 From La Serena: 49 km eastbound on Ruta 41 followed by 20 km southbound to the Observatorio Astronómico Cerro Tololo (Mount Tololo Astronomical Observatory).
 From La Serena: 60 km eastbound on Ruta 41 to Vicuña, 25 km eastbound followed by 10 km to Paihuano, and 15 km southbound to Pisco Elqui where pisco is produced.

10 km to Coquimbo

87 km to Socos

54 km to Mantos de Hornillo

93 km to Los Vilos
 The road between Los Vilos and El Melón has many steep hills, sharp turns, and heavy vehicles (including tractor-trailers).

147 km to El Melón, Región de Valparaiso

Región de Valparaiso
4 km to Nogales

4 km to Artifacto
 From Artifacto: 24 km south-southwestbound to San Pedro, 22 km westbound to Concón, and 15 km southbound to Valparaiso/Viña del Mar, Chile's second largest city. Return trip to Santiago is 128 km east-southeastbound on Ruta 68, which features two lengthy tunnels (2 km and 4 km) through mountains. Ruta 68 enters Santiago on Av. Del Libertador Bernardo O'Higgins.

24 km to Llaillay
 From Llaillay: 34 km southward to Rungue, Región Metropolitana, and 84 km south-southeastward to Santiago, Región Metropolitana. Ruta 5 enters Santiago on Av. Norte Sur.

Chile Ruta 60
 Ruta 60 (Chile Route 60) splits from Ruta 5 at Llaillay, approximately 129 km north of Santiago, the Chilean capital city. Ruta 60 runs eastward to the Andean border with Argentina.

Región de Valparaiso
5 to Chagres

13 km to Panquehue

9 km to San Felipe

6 km to Curimón

10 km to Los Ándes
 The segment between Los Ándes and Cristo Redentor features many steep hills, sharp turns, and heavy vehicles (including tractor-trailers).
 Túnel Cristo Redentor, which crosses the Chilean-Argentine border, may be closed for many days during winter storms.

33 km to Los Quilos

15 km to Río Blanco

4 km to Guardia Vieja

13 km to Juncal

10 km to Portillo
 Situated on the south edge of Lago del Inca (Inca Lake), near a skiing area.

6 km to Túnel Cristo Redentor, Chilean-Argentine Border

Argentina

Argentina National Route 7
National Route 7 is the first Argentinian leg of the Pan-American Highway. Its starting point is at the Cristo Redentor Tunnel. The latter is one of many road connections between Argentina and Chile. The Cristo Redentor Monument was erected at its highest point and gives its name to the tunnel. It was constructed by melting the bronze of the arms used by the Ejército de los Andes and inaugurated officially on March 13, 1904. Its height is about 7 meters, its weight 4 tons. National Route 7 ends in the capital city, Buenos Aires, and continues southward as Route 3.

Tierra del Fuego National Park
The southern end of the Pan-American Highway is also the southern end of Argentina National Route 3 in Tierra del Fuego National Park.

See also
Gulf of Paria crossing
Interoceanic Highway

References

South America
Road transport in South America